Hand Deeps is an area of the English Channel located  south-west of Rame Head, Cornwall and  north-west of the Eddystone. The name comes from the five pinnacles there which rise from the surrounding sea bed depth of 55 metres to depth between 7 and 19 metres from the surface.

The central pinnacle rises from more than 40 metres to 7 metres. Its anemone-covered walls and frequent good visibility make it a popular dive site.

References

Underwater diving sites in England